This is a list of disasters and tragic events in Bangladesh sorted by death toll.

Throughout history, Bangladesh has been attacked by various types of natural disasters. Most of the natural disasters happen during May to July.

100 or more deaths

See also  
 List of Bangladesh tropical cyclones

References 

Disasters in Bangladesh
Bangladesh
Bangladesh
Disasters